U.S. Route 34 (US 34) is a part of the U.S. Highway System that travels from Granby, Colorado, to Berwyn, Illinois. In the U.S. state of Colorado, US 34 is a  road that spans across northern Colorado. It begins at US 40 in Granby and ends at the Nebraska border, where it continues as US 34, east of Laird.

Route description

Granby to Rocky Mountain National Park
The route begins in Granby at US 40. It then follows the Colorado River Valley near Granby Lake and enters Arapaho National Recreational Area.

Trail Ridge Road

After entering Rocky Mountain National Park in Colorado's Front Range, US 34 follows the North Fork Colorado River through Kawuneeche Valley. It passes over Milner Pass and reaches the Alpine Visitor Center. Then it continues east, passing its highest point at 12,183 feet near Fall River Pass. It exits the park at US 36 at Deer Ridge Junction.

US 34 here is the highest continuous highway in the United States.

This section of US 34 requires a $30 national park entrance fee, making this segment into a toll road.

Estes Park to Loveland

From here, it passes by Estes Park, has a business route, and then continues east through Big Thompson Canyon before entering Loveland as Eisenhower Boulevard, becoming a four-lane expressway. Here, it intersects I-25 and U.S. Highway 287.

Greeley to Nebraska border

At Greeley, it passes by U.S. Highway 85 in a complex interchange and U.S. 34 Business, and crosses the South Platte River. It also has an interchange with SH 257. From here, it is no longer an expressway. It intersects SH 144 and SH 39, then joins I-76 at Wiggins. It leaves, and follows the North Fork Republican River east into Nebraska, where it intersects SH 71, SH 52, SH 63, SH 61, SH 59, and U.S. Highway 385.

History

Parts of the route were originally designated as US 38. US 34 was extended into Colorado in 1939.

Major intersections

References

34
 Colorado
Transportation in Grand County, Colorado
Transportation in Larimer County, Colorado
Transportation in Weld County, Colorado
Transportation in Morgan County, Colorado
Transportation in Washington County, Colorado
Transportation in Yuma County, Colorado